David Henry Keller (December 23, 1880 – July 13, 1966) was an American writer who worked for pulp magazines in the mid-twentieth century, in the science fiction, fantasy, and horror genres. He was also a psychiatrist and physician to shell-shocked soldiers during World War I and World War II, and his experience treating mentally ill people is evident in some of his writing, which contains references to mental disorders. He initially wrote short stories as a hobby and published his first science fiction story in Amazing Stories in 1928. He continued to work as a psychiatrist while publishing over sixty short stories in science fiction and horror genres. Technically, his stories were not well-written, but focused on the emotional aspects of imaginative situations, which was unusual for stories at the time.

Biography
Keller was born in Philadelphia on December 23, 1880. He graduated from the School of Medicine at the University of Pennsylvania in 1903. He served as a neuropsychiatrist in the U.S. Army Medical Corps during World Wars I and II and specifically treated shell-shock during World WarI. Keller was the Assistant Superintendent of the Louisiana State Mental Hospital at Pineville until Huey Long's reforms removed him from his position in 1928. He specialized in psychoanalysis and also worked in hospitals in Tennessee and Pennsylvania. Keller started out writing recreationally, and had written thirteen novels and fifty short stories before he considered publishing. His wife encouraged him to try profiting from his hobby. Keller's first published work was "Aunt Martha", (1895, Bath Weekly) under the pseudonym Monk Smith.

Keller published his first science fiction story, "The Revolt of the Pedestrians", in February 1928 with Hugo Gernsback in Amazing Stories. Writing during the era of Ford's Model T, Keller may have been the first to consider the long-term effects of mainstream automobiles in the United States. Gernsback was impressed by Keller's quality of writing, unique insight, and ability to address sophisticated themes beyond the commonplace technological predictions or lurid alien encounters typically found in early pulp stories. He encouraged Keller's writing and would later call these distinctive short stories "Keller yarns". Keller remained an active contributor to Amazing Stories through the late 1930s.

In 1929, Gernsback founded the magazine Science Wonder Stories and published Keller's work in the first issue. This began an intense writing period for Keller, but he was unable to support his family solely on a writer's income, so he set up a small private psychiatric practice out of his home in Mount Pocono, Pennsylvania. Gernsback also commissioned Keller to edit his magazine Sexology from 1934 to 1938. Keller published over 60 science fiction and fantasy stories.

Keller became an early scholar of H. P. Lovecraft, publishing occasional works on Lovecraft from 1948 to 1965. Most notably, he was the first to suggest, in 1948, the influential but erroneous idea that Lovecraft could have inherited syphilis from his parents. Lovecraft publisher Arkham House published many books in the fantasy and horror field including a small but steady number throughout the 1950s. Robert Weinberg wrote that a "generous loan" from Keller "prevented Arkham from going bankrupt during a period of cash flow problems". Keller died on July 13, 1966. Robert Weinberg wrote that while Keller was popular as a short story writer in the 1920s and 1930s, his novels did not sell well. Several budding science fiction fan presses, Avalon Publishing Company, New Era Publishers, and NFFF, folded after trying to produce and sell a book by Keller.

Themes
John Clute describes Keller's early work, published by Hugo Gernsback, as containing "heavily foregrounded concepts and Inventions and with their endemic indifference to plausible narrative follow-through". Keller's work often expressed strong right-wing views. Everett F. Bleiler claims he was "an ultra-conservative ideologically". He was especially hostile to feminists and African Americans. Keller's 1928 story "The Menace" revolves about a series of black plots to take over the United States; it has been described by Bleiler as "racially bigotted". Bleiler described the series of stories in "The Menace" as "probably the most offensive to be found in early science-fiction". The last of these, "The Insane Avalanche", is a racist story about removing the black and lower-class white populations of America through violence and deportation. Keller expressed misogynistic views in stories like "Tiger Cat" where an opera singer tortures men into applauding her singing. He used a folklore motif in "The Bridle", where a man uses a magic bridle to turn a witch into a horse until she stops being evil.

Keller was heavily influenced by his personal experiences as a WWI doctor who primarily treated shell-shock. The cultural effects of WWI are evident in Keller's "pessimism" towards humanity, displayed in his works. This "corrosive attitude toward both science and civilization" appeared in his "anti-feminist, racist tendencies" and occasional "sexual sadism". Keller's themes were unique from those of his contemporaries; he emphasized the humanistic and sociological approach to science fiction. Skeptical of relinquishing all control to new technologies, Keller's works examined the human, emotional side to scientific arguments. Examples of this are found in "The Revolt of the Pedestrians" (1928), "Stenographer's Hands" (1928), and "The Threat of the Robot". His horror examined ways abnormal psychology can affect behavior and the body.

Style
Clute conceded that while Keller was not a good writer, his "conceptual inventiveness, and his cultural gloom, are worth more attention than they have received". Keller's writing style reflected author and publisher Hugo Gernsback's wishes for the SF community in Amazing Stories. In a collection of early science fiction, editors Isaac Asimov and Martin Greenberg described Keller as "one of the most conceptually sophisticated" science fiction writers of his time, Bleiler described Keller as "a very poor technician" with "no power of criticism" when it came to writing fiction. However, he also argued that Keller "occasionally wrote fable-like stories, detached from daily realities and surrogate science fiction realities, that were excellent".  In his summary of many of Keller's stories, Bleiler often described their writing and execution as poor, describing "Unlocking the Past" as having "the usual bad writing". The St. James Guide to Science Fiction Writers praised his use of the trope where a first-person narrator gradually reveals their insanity while not realizing it themselves.

Keller wrote a number of horror and fantasy stories, which some critics, including Régis Messac, regard as superior to his science fiction work. Highly influenced by his psychiatric background, Keller produced many successful works in horror. Critics claim that there are three main aspects to Keller's writing: uniqueness of style, originality of concept, and influence from Keller's personal experiences. When his writing delves into topics he is less familiar with, the stories become less strong and accurate. The mental disorders in his psychological horrors are often explicitly identified, and his fantasy horrors often symbolize mental disorders. His 1932 horror tale "The Thing in the Cellar" has had 14 reprintings. The story features a boy who is frightened of the cellar, because he knows something is there. To prove that he is incorrect, his family locks him in the kitchen with the open cellar. The boy is found dead the next morning. Keller also created a series of fantasy stories called the Tales of Cornwall sequence, about the Hubelaire family; these were influenced by James Branch Cabell. Keller also wrote some fantasy work inspired by his interest in Freudian psychology, including "The Golden Bough" (1934) and The Eternal Conflict (1939 in French; 1949 English).

Critical response 
Several of Keller's stories were popular during his lifetime. Donald Tuck lists "A Piece of Linoleum", "Stenographer's Hands", "The Ivy War", and "Revolt of the Pedestrians" as his most notable stories, after "The Thing in the Cellar".  "Stenographer's Hands" imagines a world where a company has bred humans to select for the best stenographers, but failed due to inbreeding. Bleiler noted the interesting premise, but called the ending "limp". In "The Ivy War", an ancient creature that expands like ivy takes over Philadelphia, but is killed by a toxin devised by a scientist. Keller's novel The Human Termites is described as a "novel of interest". Clute writes that the "almost delirious" The Human Termites "soon leaves behind the commonplace supposition of a termite Hive Mind [...] in which both termites and humans are seen to be governed by totalitarian central intelligences". He saw the theme as exploring the "horrors of mass combat in World War One". Bleiler described the story as "rather silly" and "mawkish".

In "Revolt of the Pedestrians", people become attached to their cars and lose the use of their legs. Being a pedestrian is outlawed. A rogue group of pedestrians destroy electricity, causing the deaths of many automobilists. Clute writes that it was unusual for a science fiction story to "treat the hypertrophy of automobile culture in the twentieth century as Dystopian". Bleiler described the story as "powerful", "horrible at times, but imaginative and rigorous in logic", and one of the few Keller stories that is worth reading.

Bibliography
Unless otherwise noted, the following information comes from the Internet Speculative Fiction Database. This list is incomplete. Keller wrote many of his stories years before publishing them. He was also known by the pseudonyms Monk Smith, Matthew Smith, Amy Worth, Henry Cecil, Cecilia Henry, and Jacobus Hubelaire.

Novels
 The Conquerors, Science Wonder Stories Dec 29 and Jan 30, 1929 and 1930.
 The Human Termites , Science Wonder Stories Sep, Oct, Nov, 1929.
 The Evening Star, Science Wonder Stories April, May 1930.
 The Time Projector (w/ David Lasser) Wonder Stories Aug, Sep, 1931.
 The Metal Doom, Amazing Stories May, June, July, 1932; Fantastic Nov 1967, Jan 1968.
 Life Everlasting, Amazing Stories July, Aug 1934.
 The Devil and the Doctor. Simon & Schuster. 1940. Cover art by Gregor Duncan. Reprint: Arno Press (Supernatural and Occult Fiction), 1976, .
 The Abyss. Published in Solitary Hunters and The Abyss. New Era Publishers, cover art by John Baltadonis. 1948.
 The Homunculus. Prime Press. 1949 
  The Lady Decides. Prime Press. 1950

Short fiction

(1928) - "The Revolt of the Pedestrians" - Amazing Stories Feb
(1928) - "The Menace" - Amazing Stories Quarterly Summer 
(1928) - "A Biological Experiment" - Amazing Stories June 
(1928) - "The Psychophonic Nurse" - Amazing Stories Nov 
(1928) - "Stenographer's Hands" - Amazing Stories Quarterly Fall 
(1928) - "The Dogs of Salem" - Weird Tales September 
(1928) - "The Yeast Men" - Amazing Stories Quarterly April 
(1929) - "White Collars" - Amazing Stories April 
(1929) - "The Jelly Fish" - Weird Tales Jan 
(1929) - "The Worm" - Amazing Stories Mar
(1929) - "The Damsel and Her Cat" - Weird Tales Apr
(1929) - "The Bloodless War" - Air Wonder Stories Jul
(1929) - "The Boneless Horror" - Science Wonder Stories Jul 
(1929) - "The Flying Fool" - Amazing Stories Jul 
(1929) - "The Feminine Metamorphosis" - (as Amy Worth) Science Wonder Stories Aug
(1929) - "The Battle of the Toads" - Weird Tales Oct 
(1929) - "The Tailed Man of Cornwall" - Weird Tales Nov 
(1929) - "Dragon's Blood" - Fanews
(1930) - "Air Lines" - Amazing Stories Jan 
(1930) - "Creation Unforgivable" - Weird Tales April 
(1930) - "The Ivy War" - Amazing Stories May 
(1930) - "Boomeranging 'Round the Moon" - Amazing Stories Quarterly, Fall 1930; reprinted in Science Fiction Classics, Winter 1967, ed. Ralph Adris (Magazine Productions)
(1931) - "The Cerebral Library" - Amazing Stories May 
(1931) - "Free as the Air" - Amazing Stories June 
(1931) - "The Rat Racket" - Amazing Stories Nov 
(1932) - "The Pent House" - Amazing Stories Feb
(1932) - "The Thing in the Cellar" - Weird Tales March 
(1932) - "The Hidden Monster" - Oriental Stories Summer 
(1932) - "No More Tomorrows" - Amazing Stories Dec 
(1933) - "A Piece of Linoleum" - (as Amy Worth) 10 Story Book Dec 
(1934) - "The Lost Language" - Amazing Stories Jan 
(1934) - "The Dead Woman" - Fantasy Magazine April 
(1934) - "The Literary Corkscrew" - Wonder Stories March 
(1934) - "Binding Deluxe" - Marvel Tales May
(1934) - "The Doorbell" - Wonder Stories June 
(1934) - "The Golden Bough" - Marvel Tales Win 
(1935) - "The Living Machine" - Wonder Stories May 
(1938) - "Dust in the House" - Weird Tales July 
(1938) - "The Thirty and One" - Marvel Science Stories Nov 
(1939) - "The Moon Artist" - Cosmic Tales Summer 
(1941) - "The Goddess of Zion" - Weird Tales Jan 
(1941) - "The Red Death" - Cosmic Stories July 
(1942) - "The Bridle" - Weird Tales Sept 
(1947) - "Heredity" - The Vortex #2 
(1947) - "The Face in the Mirror" in Life Everlasting and Other Tales of Science, Fantasy and Horror (The Avalon Company). Reprinted in: Life Everlasting and Other Tales of Science, Fantasy and Horror (1974), in Hyperion Press's Classics of Science Fiction series, . Also reprinted in: Keller Memento (2010) by Ramble House, .
(1948) - "Helen of Troy Loki" 
(1948) - "The Perfumed Garden" - The Gorgon v2 #4 
(1949) - "The Door" - The Arkham Sampler Summer 
(1951) - "Chasm of Monsters" - Also published in The Folsom Flint and Other Curious Tales (1969) by Arkham House, and Keller Memento (November, 2010) by Ramble House, . 
(1952) - "The Folsom Flint" - Also published in The Folsom Flint and Other Curious Tales (1969) by Arkham House, and in Keller Memento (2010) by Ramble House, . 
(1952) - "Fingers in the Sky" - Also published in The Folsom Flint and Other Curious Tales (1969) by Arkham House, and in Keller Memento (2010) by Ramble House, .
(1952) - "The God Wheel" - Tales from Underwood, Arkham House and Pellegrini & Cudahy. 
(1952) - "The Opium Eater" - Tales from Underwood, Arkham House and Pellegrini & Cudahy.
(1953) - "The Golden Key" - Destiny Spring. Also published in The Folsom Flint and Other Curious Tales (1969) by Arkham House, and in Keller Memento (2010) by Ramble House, .
(1953) - "The Question" - Fantastic Worlds Fall
(1962) - "In Memoriam" - Dark Mind, Dark Heart, ed. August Derleth, (Arkham House)
(1969) - "The Landslide" - The Folsom Flint and Other Curious Tales, Arkham House. 
(1980) - "The House Without Mirrors" - Weird Tales #1, (Dec 1980), ed. Lin Carter, publ. Zebra Books / Kensington Publishing Corp., .

Early works
Works on this list come from the David H. Keller Collection description at the Swarthmore College Library.

1895 "Aunt Martha" (as Monk Smith) in Bath Weekly 
1897 "A Phenomenon of the Stars" - The Mirror Feb 
1899 "Judge Not" - in The Red and Blue (University of Pennsylvania) Nov 
1900 "The Silent One" - in The Red and Blue Nov 
1901 "A University Story" - (as Henry Cecil), in Presbyterian Journal (University of Pennsylvania) Dec 
1902 "The Birth of a Soul" - (as Henry Cecil), in The White Owl Jan 
1902 "A Three Linked Tail" - (as Matthew Smith), in The White Owl March 
1902 "The Winning Bride" - (as Henry Cecil), in The White Owl March 
1902 "The Great American Pie House" - (as Cecilia Henry), in The White Owl April 
1902 "Mother Newhouse" - (as Henry Cecil), in The White Owl May 
1902 "The Greatness of Duval" - in Ursinus Weekly Oct

Poetry
1924 Songs of a Spanish Lover - privately printed under the name Henry Cecil

Nonfiction
(1928) The Sexual Education Series, Roman Publishing Company, New York:
1. Sex and Family Through the Ages
2. The Sexual Education of a Young Man
3.Sexual Education of the Young Woman
4. Love, Courtship, Marriage
5. Companionate Marriage, Birth Control, Divorce, and Modern Home Life
6. Mother and Baby
7. Sexual Diseases and Abnormalities of Adult Life
8. The Sexual Life of Men and Women After Forty
9. Diseases and Problems of Old Age
10. Sex and Society
(1933) "Types of Science Fiction" in Science Fiction Digest, March 1933, ed. Maurice Z. Ingher.
(1940) "The Psychology of Fear" in The Thing in the Cellar, publ. The Bizarre Series #2.
(1941) "The Med-Lee: News Digest of the 9th Medical Battalion" :12 Nov, 19 Nov, 26 Nov, 10 Dec
(1947) "Dr. David H. Keller on His Half a Century of Writing" in The Last Magician: Nine Stories from Weird Tales (Apr 1978), P.D.A. Enterprises (The David H. Keller Memorial Library #1).
(1948) "What Price Beauty?" in The Fanscient, #3 Spring 1948, ed. Donald B. Day. The Portland Science Fiction Society. 
(1948) "Author, Author: David H. Keller, M.D." in The Fanscient, #5 Fall 1948, ed. Donald B. Day. The Portland Science Fiction Society.
(1949) "Book Reviewing" in The Fanscient, #7 Spring 1949, ed. Donald B. Day. The Portland Science Fiction Society. 
(1949) "Stories and Life" in The Fanscient, #9 Fall 1949, ed. Donald B. Day. The Portland Science Fiction Society. 
(1950) "Longevity" in Operation Fantast, #5 June 1950, ed. Ken Slater.  
(1958) "Shadows over Lovecraft" in Howard Phillips Lovecraft Memorial Symposium, Steve Eisner. University of Detroit. Published in Fresco, Spring 1958, v. 8, no. 3, a quarterly magazine published by the University of Detroit. Other contributors included August Derleth and Fritz Leiber.
(1985) "Titus Groan: An Appreciation" in Exploring Fantasy Worlds: Essays on Fantastic Literature, ed. Darrell Schweitzer. Borgo Press. (I.O. Evans Studies in the Philosophy and Criticism of Literature #3), . This is the same review that appeared in Operation Fantast, #4, March 1950.

See also

 Homosexuality in speculative fiction
 Sex and sexuality in speculative fiction

References

External links

 David H. Keller as Pulp Author
 
 
 
 
 
 David H. Keller Papers at Syracuse University
 David H. Keller short stories, MSS 389 at L. Tom Perry Special Collections, Brigham Young University
 

1880 births
1966 deaths
20th-century American male writers
20th-century American novelists
United States Army personnel of World War II
American fantasy writers
American horror writers
American male novelists
United States Army personnel of World War I
American psychiatrists
American science fiction writers
Perelman School of Medicine at the University of Pennsylvania alumni
United States Army Medical Corps officers
Harold B. Lee Library-related 20th century articles